The list of ship launches in 1887 includes a chronological list of some ships launched in 1887.


References

Sources

1887
 
1887 in transport